Jesus and history may refer to:

 Jesus
 Historicity of Jesus, the existence of Jesus as a historical figure
 Historical Jesus, the reconstruction of portraits of Jesus' life and teachings using historical methods
 Chronology of Jesus, the chronology of the major events of Jesus' life
 Quest for the historical Jesus, the methods and techniques used by academics to study the life of Jesus
 Historical background of the New Testament, the cultural influences that form the backdrop of Jesus' life in 1st century Judea
 Historical reliability of the Gospels, the historical validity or invalidity of the canonical gospels
 Genealogy of Jesus, study of Jesus' lineage
 Christ myth theory, the theory that Jesus was a fictional or mythological character invented by early Christians

Related topics
 Historicity of the Bible
 Jesus Christ in comparative mythology, compares the narrative of the life of Jesus from the Christian gospels with other religions
 Josephus on Jesus, the references by 1st-century Jewish historian Josephus to Jesus in his Antiquities of the Jews
 Tacitus on Christ, the reference by Tacitus in Book 15 of his Annals to Christians and the execution of their leader by Pontius Pilate
 Criticism of Jesus, criticisms of Jesus that have been raised by various scholars and writers

See also
 History of early Christianity